Tuma or Toma is a stage in the production of Pecorino cheese, which comes before adding salt and maturation. By extension, it also indicates cheese that is consumed or commercialized at this stage of production. 

In a broader sense, it can be referred to fresh cheese made of ewe's milk, cow's milk or a mixture. Originally Tuma was only made from ewe's milk, but nowadays the usage in combination with cow's milk is generally accepted.

The four stages of maturation of the Pecorino cheese are:
 Tuma (directly from the curd)
Primosale (addition of salt and maturation for one month)
Secondo sale (maturation for at least another four months)
 Pecorino stagionato (any maturation period longer than five-six months)

Cheese products can be consumed at any of those stages and are usually referred to by the last stage completed.

Tuma is a typical product of southern Italy, especially Sicily, being particularly common in the interior areas. Since it is produced from the curd without the addition of salt, it has to be consumed within one, maximum two weeks or it will spoil. 

In France, Piedmont and the Aosta Valley there is a type of cheese, produced with different methods, that has a similar name: tomme or Tome in French and tuma or toma in the local dialect.

See also
 List of Italian cheeses

References
 Elenco e descrizione dei prodotti derivati dal latte riconosciuti come tradizionali dalla Regione siciliana e allegato alla Gazzetta Ufficiale della Regione Siciliana, Palermo, Sabato 6 febbraio 1999, N. 6
 Luigi Cremona e Francesco Soletti, L'Italia dei formaggi: 490 formaggi Dop e tradizionali, 360 produttori con vendita diretta, 517 negozi specializzati, ristoranti ed enoteche con degustazione. Guida Touring, Touring Editore, 2002, p. 125

Italian cheeses
Sheep's-milk cheeses